Przyłęki may refer to the following places:
Przyłęki, Greater Poland Voivodeship (west-central Poland)
Przyłęki, Kuyavian-Pomeranian Voivodeship (north-central Poland)
Przyłęki, West Pomeranian Voivodeship (north-west Poland)